Kyle Calloway (June 21, 1987 – July 2, 2016) was an American football offensive tackle. He was drafted by the Buffalo Bills in the seventh round of the 2010 NFL Draft out of the University of Iowa.

Calloway was considered to be a late-round draft prospect in the 2010 NFL Draft. He was also a member of the Hartford Colonials and Baltimore Ravens football teams. He was killed when struck by a train while jogging in Vail, Arizona, on July 2, 2016.

Early years
As a military dependant, Calloway attended three high schools in four years. He graduated from Belleville East High School in Belleville, Illinois, where he was an all-city and all-conference tackle as a senior, and also played tight end and primarily defensive tackle as a junior.

Considered a three-star recruit by Rivals.com, Calloway was ranked 55th among offensive tackle prospects in the nation. He chose Iowa over Missouri, Kansas, and Arizona.

College career
After redshirting his initial year at Iowa, Calloway saw limited action as a back-up at left guard in 2006. In 2007, he became the starting left tackle, but was replaced with Bryan Bulaga and moved to right tackle in 2008. He received an All-Big Ten Honorable Mention as a junior.

In 2009, Calloway was listed at No. 13 on Rivals.com′s preseason offensive tackle power ranking.  In June of that year, he was arrested and "charged with operating a vehicle while intoxicated" while driving a moped.

Professional career
On June 8, 2010, Calloway signed a multi-year contract with the Buffalo Bills. He was released on August 30, 2010.

2010 NFL Draft
Calloway ranks among the best offensive tackles in his class, and draws comparisons to Marc Colombo. According to NFL.com's Gil Brandt, "Calloway should be a solid pro starter" at right tackle in the NFL. He was drafted by the Buffalo Bills in the seventh round (216th overall).

Hartford Colonials
Calloway signed to play 2011 for the United Football League's Hartford Colonials.

Baltimore Ravens
On August 9, 2011, Calloway signed with the Baltimore Ravens, but was waived on August 21.

Death 
On July 2, 2016, Calloway was jogging alongside a set of railroad tracks and was hit from behind by a train, killing him.

References

External links
Buffalo Bills bio
Iowa Hawkeyes bio

1987 births
2016 deaths
Sportspeople from Belleville, Illinois
Players of American football from Illinois
American football offensive guards
American football offensive tackles
Iowa Hawkeyes football players
Buffalo Bills players
Hartford Colonials players
Baltimore Ravens players
Accidental deaths in Arizona
Railway accident deaths in the United States